Harrison Smith Glancy (September 17, 1904 – September 22, 2002) was an American competition swimmer who represented the United States at the 1924 Summer Olympics in Paris, France and the 1928 Summer Olympics in Amsterdam, Netherlands.  In 1924, he won a gold medal as a member of the winning U.S. team in the men's 4×200-meter freestyle relay, together with teammates Ralph Breyer, Wally O'Connor and Johnny Weissmuller.  Glancy and his American teammates set new world records in both the semifinals (9:59.4) and final (9:53.4).

Glancy was inducted into the International Swimming Hall of Fame as an "Honor Pioneer Swimmer" in 1990.

See also
 List of members of the International Swimming Hall of Fame
 List of Olympic medalists in swimming (men)
 World record progression 4 × 200 metres freestyle relay

References

External links
 
 
 

1904 births
2002 deaths
People from Tyler County, West Virginia
American male freestyle swimmers
Olympic gold medalists for the United States in swimming
Swimmers at the 1924 Summer Olympics
Swimmers at the 1928 Summer Olympics
Medalists at the 1924 Summer Olympics
20th-century American people